The non-marine molluscs of Réunion are a part of the molluscan wildlife of Réunion, an island in the Indian Ocean.

Freshwater gastropods 

Ampullariidae
 Pomacea canaliculata (Lamarck, 1819)

Assimineidae
 Paludinella hidalgoi (Gassies, 1869)

Lymnaeidae
 Lymnaea natalensis Krauss, 1848
 Lantzia carinata – synonym Erinna carinata – endemic

Neritidae
 Clithon coronatus (Leach, 1815)
 Neripteron bensoni (Récluz, 1850)
 Neripteron simoni Prashad, 1921
 Neritilia rubida (Pease, 1865) – synonym: Neritilia consimilis (Martens, 1879)
 Neritina gagates (Lamarck, 1822)
 Septaria borbonica (Bory de Saint-Vincent, 1803)

Physidae
 Physa acuta (Drapanaud, 1805)

Planorbidae
 Bulimus cernicus (Morelet, 1875)
 Gyraulus mauritianus (Morelet, 1876)
 Helisoma duryi (Waterby, 1879)

Thiaridae
 Melanoides tuberculata (Müller, 1774)
 Thiara amarula (Linnaeus, 1758)
 Thiara scabra (Müller, 1774)

Viviparidae
 Bellamya bengalenbsis (Lamarck, 1822)

Land gastropods 

Charopidae
 †Pilula praetumida – endemic – extinct
Pilula cordemoyi (Nevill, 1870) – endemic

Cyclophoridae
Madgeaconcha gerlachi – endemic – described 2004

Euconulidae
 Caldwellia imperfecta
Ctenophila salaziensis – endemic
Ctenophila setiliris – endemic
Ctenophila vorticella – endemic
Plegma caelatura – endemic

Helicarionidae
Dupontia maillardi – (Deshayes, 1863) – endemic
 †Dupontia proletaria – (Morelet, 1860) – extinct
 Erepta setiliris – (Benson, 1859) – endemic
Harmogenanina argentea – (Reeve, 1852) – endemic
Harmogenanina linophora – extinct
 †Harmogenanina subdetecta – (de Férussac, 1827)- endemic – extinct

Streptaxidae
 Gonospira bourguignati – endemic
 Gonospira cylindrella – endemic
 Gonospira deshayesi – (Adams, 1868) – endemic
 Gonospira funicula – endemic
 Gonospira turgidula – endemic
 Gonospira uvula – (Deshayes, 1863) – endemic 
 Gonospira versipolis – (Deshayes, 1851) – endemic
 Gulella antelmeana – (Peile, 1936) – endemic to Mauritius & Réunion

Succineidae
Hyalimax maillardi  Fischer, 1867 (endemic)
Quickia concisa (Morelet, 1849)

Vertiginidae
 Nesopupa incerta – (Nevill, 1870) – endemic
 Nesopupa madgei – (Peile, 1936)  – subendemic
 Nesopupa micra – (Pilsbry, 1920) – subendemic
 Nesopupa morini – (Madge, 1938) – subendemic

Freshwater bivalves

Unionidae

 †Unio cariei (Nodularia cariei) – (Germain, 1919) – endemic – extinct

See also
 List of marine molluscs of Réunion
 List of non-marine molluscs of Mauritius
 List of non-marine molluscs of Madagascar

References
 (in French) M.Jay: Les mollusques d'eau douce de la Réunion

External links
 Encyclopedia of Life – Picture of Pilula cordemoy
 www.donnees.reunion.developpement-durable.gouv.fr – List of Molluscs in Réunion (in French)
 INPN – List of animals in Réunion (in French)

Réunion-related lists
Reunion
Reunion